The 1st Siwi Regiment later Siwi Mixed Brigade was a unit of Imperial Korean Army. The regiment was formed in May 1898. However after the Japan–Korea Treaty of 1907, the regiment was disestablished.

Lineage 
By the order of Gojong of Korea, 1st Siwi Regiment was established on 27 May 1898. The Regiment included 1st Siwi Battalion and 2nd Siwi Battalion. Colonel or Lieutenant Colonel was the commander, Captain was the adjutant, First or Second Lieutenant was Quartermaster and Second Lieutenant managed the ensign of the Regiment. 3 Non-commissioned officers were attached to the regiment.

Western-style Military Band was established for the Regiment. From 5 April 1902, Franz Eckert was instructor of the military band.

On 22 April 1907, the regiment became Siwi Mixed Brigade (시위혼성여단), and included 2nd Siwi Regiment, Siwi Field Artillery Battalion, Siwi Cavalry Battalion, and Siwi Pioneer Battalion.

Battle of Namdaemun 

After the Japan-Korea Treaty of 1907, 1st Siwi Regiment was planned to be disestablished. Because of this, 1st Battalion commander, Park Sung-hwan, committed suicide. This made members of 1st Siwi Regiment to not participate in disestablishment ceremony but, sparked a battle. Many soldiers from other regiments and battalions who already returned their weapons got their weapons and fought against the Imperial Japanese Army. The 2nd Siwi Regiment joined 1st Siwi Regiment for the battle. For four hours, battles was continued. However, the battle was the victory of Japan because Japanese soldiers using much advanced weapons.

Commanders

References 

Military units and formations established in 1898
Military units and formations disestablished in 1907
Korean Empire